The Albania men's national basketball team represents Albania in international basketball competitions. The national team is governed by the Albanian Basketball Association.

Albania has competed at the EuroBasket twice throughout their history, in 1947 and 1957. While the team has appeared on the continental level in the past, Albania still looks to obtain qualification to reach the FIBA World Cup.

History

20th century
Basketball was introduced in Albania in the early 20th century, and it became popular  in the 1920s following the end of World War I as sports societies and clubs were being formed all over the country, and basketball was soon introduced to the major towns and cities in Albania. Basketball was played informally by teams representing different sports clubs, and it wasn't until September 1945 that a National Basketball Committee was formed that would be responsible for dealing with the issues basketball teams in the country faced. The committee paved the way for the creation of the Albanian Basketball Association (ABA) a year later in 1946, which became a member of FIBA in 1947. Their main goals were to enable clubs to compete in national competitions, as well as to promote the sport. The first National Championship in Albania was held in 1946, and a year later the first Women's National Championship also took place. In 1951 the ABA created the Republic's Cup, which was a competition open to all professional and amateur basketball clubs in Albania, with the women's and youth versions of the competition both starting in 1952. During the Communist regime in Albania, the National Spartakiad was held between 1959 and 1989, where basketball was one of the more popular sports on display at the country's biggest sports events. In 1999, the ABA held the first Albanian Basketball Supercups for men and women, which is played between the winners of the league and cup.

Albania first competed in a European Championship at EuroBasket 1947 held in Prague, Czechoslovakia, shortly after joining FIBA as an affiliate national team. In the preliminary round of the competition Albania was placed in Group D, with Italy, Belgium and Egypt. Albania's first game in a major tournament came against Italy, which was a 15–60 loss.
In their next two matches, Albania would suffer heavy defeats at the hands of Belgium 114–11 and to Egypt 19–104. In the next round, Albania were placed in the lower bracket Group 3 to determine who finishes between 7th and 10th place. There, the national team were up against Romania and Austria. Albania would go on to lose 19–73 to Romania and 27–44 to Austria. The team then went on to face Yugoslavia in the final game to determine 13th and 14th place, where they would lose 13–90 to Yugoslavia to finish in last place out of 14 teams. During the tournament, Albania registered a record of (0–6), while averaging just 17.3 points per game. Their highest point tally came against Austria where they scored 27 points, which was also the match where the team had its smallest margin of defeat at 17 points. Albania conceded an average of 80.3 points per game, with their highest scoring opponent being Belgium.

Ten years after their debut tournament appearance at the Euros, Albania competed at EuroBasket 1957 in Sofia, Bulgaria. Albania were placed in Group A in the preliminary round with Czechoslovakia, Yugoslavia and Scotland. The national team lost 57–89 to Yugoslavia in their opening match, and then went on to lose 71–37 to Czechoslovakia and 65–42 against Scotland to finish bottom of the group. During the classification round, Albania faced Turkey, Italy, Finland, Belgium, West Germany, Austria and Scotland. Albania would lose all seven games in the classification round, which sent the team toward finishing at the bottom of another EuroBasket tournament, this time out of 16 teams. Albania during the competition averaged 47.6 points per game, with their highest points tally coming against Turkey in a 64–97 defeat. Albania conceded an average of 78.4 points per game during their ten games played at the event. Despite putting up better statistical numbers than those in 1947, Albania could not manage to earn a victory at the Euros for the second consecutive tournament.

After EuroBasket 1957, Albania failed to reach a major tournament again throughout the rest of the 20th century. Although the national team did go on to attempt to qualify on numerous occasions, including for the 1972 Summer Olympics. That was where Albania competed in qualification to reach the Olympic Games for the first time. However, the team was defeated in all three of its games during qualifying to come up short. Also, during qualifying for EuroBasket 1975, where Albania put up record feats in their attempt to make it back on to the continental stage. It was where the team earned their highest margin of victory versus an opponent to that point, against Iceland 112–77; as well as earning their first three game winning streak. Although even behind heroic performances, Albania would narrowly miss out on clinching qualification.

21st century
In 2002, Albania entered a smaller competition, the 2002 European Championship for Small Countries. Albania would begin the tournament in Group A, where the team would eventually earn a (2–1) record. However, due to point differential, Albania missed out on advancing to the knockout phase and were relegated to the classification round. There, the team defeated Gibraltar, but lost to Moldova to finish the tournament in sixth place.

After achieving nearly similar results at the competition in 2004, Albania were poised to change the narrative at the 2006 tournament. The national team quickly set the tone, as they went undefeated (3–0) in the group stage to advance. In the semis, Albania won a high scoring affair against Andorra 111–101, to send the team into the final. Although the team would fall short of winning the competition, losing a tightly contested match to Azerbaijan to finish as the runners-up.

Entering qualification for EuroBasket 2017, Albania struggled to a (1–5) record during the qualifiers, picking up their lone victory against Slovakia and missing out to qualify. During the process for Albania to qualify for the 2019 FIBA World Cup, the national team went through European Pre-Qualifiers. However, Albania were overwhelmed in all four of their matches in the pre-qualifying stage, and failed to advance.

Following Albania's lost attempt to qualify for the 2019 World Cup, the team directed their attention toward EuroBasket 2022 qualifying. Although Albania would display similar results which caused the team to miss out on the World Cup, and being eliminated.

Competitive record

FIBA World Cup

Olympic Games

Championship for Small Countries

EuroBasket

Mediterranean Games

Results and fixtures

2020

2021

2022

Team

Current roster
Roster for the EuroBasket 2025 Pre-Qualifiers match on 3 July 2022 against Romania.

Depth chart

Head coach history

Past rosters
1947 EuroBasket: finished 14th among 14 teams

3 Muntaz Peshkopia, 4 Naim Pilku, 5 Bajram Kurani, 6 Çerçiz Zavalani, 7 Dilaver Toptani, 8 Ferdin Toptani, 9 Vlash Koljaka,10 Dhimitraq Goga (Coach:  Naim Pilku)

1957 EuroBasket: finished 16th among 16 teams

3 Ilo Teneqexhi, 4 Feti Borova, 5 Dhimitraq Goga, 6 Kiço Gjata, 7 Ferdinand Qirici, 8 Muhamet Përmeti, 9 Fatmir Meka,10 Muhamet Sokoli, 11 Salvador Sotiri, 12 Muhamet Moursakou, 13 Jorgji Çako (Coach:  Naim Pilku)

See also

Sport in Albania
Albania women's national basketball team
Albania men's national under-18 basketball team
Albania men's national under-16 basketball team

Notes

References

External links

Official website 
Albania FIBA profile
Albania National Team – Men at Eurobasket.com
Albania Basketball Records at FIBA Archive

 
Men's national basketball teams
 
1947 establishments in Albania